The following is a list of presidents of Campeche Municipality, Mexico. The municipality includes Campeche City.

List of officials

 Joaquín Esquivel Cantón, 1916-1917 
 Cristóbal Donantes Virgilio, 1918 
 Marcelo Gómez, 1919 
 Francisco G. Torres, 1920 
 Ramón Félix Flores, 1921 
 Eduardo Mena Córdoba, 1922 
 Angel Castillo Lanz, 1923 
 Javier Illescas A., 1924-1925 
 Ulises Sansores, 1926-1927 
 Domingo Pérez Méndez, 1928-1929 
 Víctor Velázquez Marina, 1930-1931 
 Eduardo Arceo Zumárraga, 1932-1933 
 Miguel Lanz Gutiérrez, 1934-1935 
 Manuel S. Silva M., 1936-1937 
 Domingo Granados M., 1938-1939 
 Eduardo Lavalle Urbina, 1940-1941 
 Asunción Martínez Camargo, 1942-1943 
 Francisco Alvarez Barret, 1944-1946 
 Rafael Alcalá Dónde, 1947-1949 
 Fernando Rosado Reyes, 1950-1952 
 Alberto Ferrer Ferrer, 1953-1955 
 Leovigilio Gómez Hernández, 1956-1958 
 Eugenio Echeverría Castellón, 1959-1961 
 Ricardo Castelot Oliver, 1962-1964 
 Rafael Rodríguez Barrera, 1965-1967 
 Luis Vera Esquivel, 1968-1970 
 Enrique Escalante Escalante, 1971-1973 
 Alvaro Arceo Corcuera, 1974-1976 
 Carlos Pérez Cámara, 1977-1979 
 Tirso R. de la Gala, 1980-1982 
 Edilberto Buenfil Montalvo, 1983-1985 
 José Medina Maldonado, 1986-1988 
 Jorge Luis González Curi, 1989-1991 
 Gabriel Escalante Castillo, 1992-1994 
 Antonio González Curi, 1995-1997 
 Javier Buenfil Osorio, 1997 
 Víctor Manuel Méndez Lanz, 1997-2000 
 Jorge Carlos Hurtado Valdez, 2000-2003 
 Fernando Ortega Bernés, 2003-2006 
 Edgar Román Hernández Hernández, 2015-2018 
 Eliseo Fernández Montufar, 2018-current 
Biby Karen Rabelo starting 2021

See also
 
 
 Timeline of Campeche City

References

Campeche
Politicians from Campeche
History of Campeche